Samir Tandir (born 3 March 1984) is a Serbian Bosniak politician. He was a leading figure in Muamer Zukorlić's political movement for several years and served in the National Assembly of Serbia from 2020 to 2022 as a member of the Justice and Reconciliation Party (Stranka pravde i pomirenja, SPP).

Tandir became alienated from the SPP's new leadership after Muamer Zukorlić's death in 2021 and left the party after his parliamentary term ended. In October 2022, he formed a new political party called the Bosniak-Serb Alliance (Bošnjačko-srpski savez, BOSS).

Early life and private career
Tandir was born in Prijepolje, in what was then the Socialist Republic of Serbia in the Socialist Federal Republic of Yugoslavia. He graduated from the Faculty of Economics in Novi Pazar; in 2021, he was described as working toward a master's degree from the same institution. He was a teacher of religious studies from 2006 to 2010 and served as an Imam in Prijepolje from 2006 to 2012, when he resigned to focus on his political work.

Politician

Bosniak National Council (2010–18)
Tandir served as secretary for Chief Mufti Muamer Zukorlić from 2008 to 2010. From 2009 to 2012, he was Zukorlić's official spokesperson and president of the executive board of Zukorlić's Bosniak Cultural Community movement.

Serbia organized the first direct elections for the country's national minority councils in 2010. The Bosniak Cultural Community contested the election for the Bosniak National Council and won seventeen mandates, as opposed to thirteen for the Bosniak List led by Sulejman Ugljanin and five for the Bosniak Renaissance group of Rasim Ljajić. Tandir was among the candidates elected on Zukorlić's electoral list. The results were extremely contentious, and the legitimacy of the Bosniak Cultural Community's victory was contested by both the Serbian government and Ugljanin's party. The council's responsibilities were officially suspended soon after the election, although Zukorlić's group continued to oversee what it described as council meetings in defiance of the government's decision. Tandir was president of the breakaway council's executive board from 2010 to 2012 and served as president of the council itself from 2012 to 2014. In December 2010, he was part of a delegation that met with Bakir Izetbegović, the Bosniak member of Bosnia and Herzegovina's collective presidency, to seek international support on Bosniak and Sandžak issues in Serbia.

Tandir was a founding member of the Bosniak Democratic Union (Bošnjačka demokratska zajednica, BDZ) in late 2010 and became a party vice-president in 2012. The BDZ contested the 2012 Serbian parliamentary election as part of the All Together (Sve Zajedno) alliance of national minority parties. Tandir was included in the second position on the alliance's list, after BDZ leader Emir Elfić. The list won a single seat, which was automatically assigned to Elfić.

The BDZ experienced a split in 2013 between supporters of Elfić and supporters of Zukorlić. Tandir sided with Zukorlić and became a founding member of the breakaway Bosniak Democratic Union of Sandžak (Bošnjačka demokratska zajednica Sandžaka, BDZS) later in the year; in 2014, he was chosen as a party vice-president. The BDZS contested the 2014 parliamentary election on the electoral list of the Liberal Democratic Party (Liberalno demokratska partija, LDP), and Tandir was included on the list in the thirteenth position. Election from this position was a credible possibility, but the list did not cross the electoral threshold for assembly representation.

A new election was held for the Bosniak National Council in 2014, and Tandir appeared in the seventh position on Zukorlić's For Bosniaks, Sandžak and the Mufti list. The only other list to appear on the ballot was Ugljanin's For Bosniak Unity. Ugljanin's list won the election, nineteen seats to sixteen. Zukorlić's group initially raised concerns about electoral fraud but ultimately accepted the results, and Tandir served as a member of the opposition. He did not seek re-election to the council in 2018.

Parliamentarian and municipal representative (2016–present)
Tandir appeared in the fourth position on the BDZS's list in the 2016 parliamentary election; the list won two mandates, and he was not elected. He also received the lead position on a combined BDZS–LDP list for the Prijepolje municipal assembly in the concurrent 2016 Serbian local elections and was elected when the list won five mandates.

The BDZS was reconstituted as the Justice and Reconciliation Party in 2017. Tandir was promoted to the second position on the party's list in the 2020 parliamentary election and was elected when the list won four mandates. He also received the lead position on the SPP's list in Prijepolje for the 2020 Serbian local elections and was re-elected when the list won eight mandates.

The Serbian Progressive Party (Srpska napredna stranka, SNS) and its allies won a landslide majority victory in the parliamentary vote; the SPP did not afterward join Serbia's SNS-led coalition government but provided it with outside support. As five members are required for an official parliamentary group, the SPP formed a group with Milija Miletić of the United Peasant Party (Ujedinjena seljačka stranka, USS), who was also aligned with the Progressives. Tandir served as the group's leader in the assembly. During the 2020–22 parliament, he was also a member of the committee on spatial planning, transport, infrastructure, and telecommunications; a member of the committee on the diaspora and Serbs in the region; and a member of the parliamentary friendship groups with Albania, Argentina, Armenia, Azerbaijan, Austria, Bahrain, Belarus, Belgium, Bosnia and Herzegovina, Brazil, Canada, China, Croatia, Cyprus, Denmark, Egypt, France, Georgia, Germany, Greece, the Holy See, Hungary, Indonesia, Iran, Iraq, Israel, Italy, Japan, Morocco, the Netherlands, North Macedonia, Palestine, Portugal, Qatar, Russia, Slovenia, South Africa, the Malta, Spain, Turkey, Ukraine, the United Arab Emirates, the United Kingdom, and the United States.

Muamer Zukorlić died in November 2021, and the leadership of the SPP passed to his son, Usame Zukorlić. Tandir did not have a good working relationship with the new leadership, and he was not a candidate in the 2022 Serbian parliamentary election. He resigned from the party after the election, accusing it of carrying out "North Korea-style purges" of dissident voices and moving away from its original purpose. Most of the SPP's organization in Prijepolje joined him in leaving the party.

In leaving the SPP, Tandir indicated that he would establish a new political party called the Bosniak-Serb Alliance; the party was officially launched in October 2022. A list aligned with the party is currently contesting the 2022 elections for the Bosniak National Council; its bearer is Admir Muratović, an independent member of the Novi Pazar city assembly.

Tandir continues to serve as a member of the Prijepolje municipal assembly.

References

1984 births
Living people
Bosniaks of Serbia
People from Prijepolje
Members of the National Assembly (Serbia)
Members of the Bosniac National Council (Serbia)
Bosniak Democratic Union politicians
Bosniak Democratic Union of Sandžak politicians
Justice and Reconciliation Party politicians
Bosniak-Serb Alliance politicians